Girardin is a French-language surname, in some cases a francization of Italian surname Gherardini. It may refer to:

People
 Girardin family, a French branch of the Italian Gherardini family:
  (d. 1689), French ambassador to Constantinople
  (1647–1724), French Navy administrator
 René de Girardin, Marquis de Vauvray (1735–1808), French gardener and writer on gardens, Jean-Louis's grandon
 Louis Stanislas de Girardin (1762–1827), French general and politician, René-Louis's son
  (1767–1848), French politician, René-Louis's son
  (1776–1855), French general, René-Louis's son
  (1802–1874), French politician, Louis Stanislas's son
 Émile de Girardin (1806–1881), French journalist, Alexandre's illegitimate son
 Delphine de Girardin, née Gay, (1804–1855), French writer, Émile's wife

 Annick Girardin (b. 1964), French politician
  (1830–1915), French politician
 Brigitte Girardin (born 1953), French politician
 Émile Girardin (1895–1982), Canadian businessman
 Éric Girardin (b. 1962), French politician
 Étienne Girardin (b. 1994), French singer of chorus group Vox Angeli
  (1888–1972), French architect
 Frank J. Girardin (1856–1945), American artist
  (1803–1884), French chemist
 Jules Girardin (1832–1888), French writer
 Lise Girardin (1921–2010), Swiss politician
 Marc Girardin a.k.a. Saint-Marc Girardin (1801–1873), French politician
 Marie-Louise Victoire Girardin (1754–1794), French ship's steward and cross-dresser
  (1749–1786), French architect
 Paul Girardin (1875–1950), French geographer
 Ray Girardin (1935–2019), American film, stage and television actor

Companies
 Girardin Brewery (est. 1845), a family owned brewery in Belgium
 Girardin Minibus (est. 1935), a Canadian bus manufacturer

See also 
 Girard (disambiguation) and Girard (surname)
 Gérardin
 Gherardini and Gherardini family
 

French-language surnames